The 2008–09 West Midlands (Regional) League season was the 109th in the history of the West Midlands (Regional) League, an English association football competition for semi-professional and amateur teams based in the West Midlands county, Shropshire, Herefordshire, Worcestershire and southern Staffordshire. It has three divisions, the highest of which is the Premier Division, which sits at step 6 of the National League System, or the tenth level of the overall English football league system.

Premier Division

The Premier Division featured 19 clubs which competed in the division last season, along with two new clubs, promoted from Division One:
Birchills United
Heath Town Rangers

Also, Birchills United changed name to Bloxwich United.

League table

References

External links
 West Midlands (Regional) League

2008–09
10